Hondōri is a Hiroden station on Hiroden Ujina Line located in Hondōri, Naka-ku, Hiroshima.

Routes
From Hondōri Station, there are three of Hiroden Streetcar routes.

 Hiroden Streetcar Route 1
 Hiroden Streetcar Route 3
 Hiroden Streetcar Route 7

Connections
█ Ujina Line

Kamiya-cho-higashi — Hondōri — Fukuro-machi
 
Kamiya-cho-nishi — Hondōri — Fukuro-machi

Other services connections
█ Astram Line
Astram Line Connections at Astram Hondōri Station

Around station
Hiroshima Peace Memorial Park
Hiroshima Hondōri Shōtengai
Hiroshima Andersen
Hiroshima Kenmin Bunka Center
Rijyo Kaikan Hotel

History
Opened as "Kawaya-machi" on November 23, 1912.
Service was stopped from June 10, 1944 to September 11, 1945.
Service restarted on September 12, 1945.
Renamed to the present station name "Hondōri", on April 1, 1965.

See also
Hiroden lines and routes

References

Hiroden Ujina Line stations
Railway stations in Japan opened in 1912